KIYU-FM is a Public Radio formatted broadcast radio station licensed to Galena, Alaska, serving the Alaska Bush.  KIYU is owned and operated by Big River Public Broadcasting Corporation.

KIYU had originally broadcast on AM at 910 kHz, but the license for the AM station was surrendered on May 4, 2020. The FM station began broadcasting in 2008, and remains on the air.

Rebroadcasters
In addition to the main station, KIYU is relayed on 10 full-power FM repeaters to widen its broadcast area. KIYU programming is also simulcast on KRFF in Fairbanks, weekday afternoons.

References

External links
 KIYU Online

FCC Station Search Details for KIYU (AM)  (deleted May 5, 2020, Facility ID: 5282)

1986 establishments in Alaska
Public radio stations in the United States
Radio stations established in 1986
IYU
IYU
NPR member stations